Below is a list of current and historical peacekeeping missions which were not mandated by the United Nations.

Current

NATO

 KFOR is a NATO-led multinational force responsible for establishing and maintaining security in Kosovo. This peace-enforcement force entered Kosovo on June 12, 1999 under a United Nations mandate, two days after the adoption of UN Security Council Resolution 1244, but it is not a United Nations blue helmeted peacekeeping mission.

African Union
Current African Union missions include:
 AMISOM is the African Union force in Somalia since February 2007 in response to the War in Somalia.
 MISCA is the African Union force in CAR since 2011 response to the Central African Republic conflict under the Djotodia administration.

Others
 Multinational Force and Observers on the Sinai Peninsula mandated on April 25, 1982 continues to observe compliance with the Egyptian-Israeli Treaty of Peace.  It is an observation organisation not an occupation but it does place some restrictions on the sovereignty of the area it observes.
 Nonviolent Peaceforce is a private, unarmed non-profit, which as of 2017 had ongoing operations in the Philippines, South Sudan, Myanmar, and Syria.
UNMIK, a joint mission with United Nations in Kosovo since 1999.

Historical

NATO

 IFOR was a NATO-led multinational force that took over responsibilities from UNPROFOR in Bosnia-Herzegovina, 1995–1996.
 SFOR was a NATO-led multinational force that took over responsibilities from IFOR, 1996–2004.
 ISAF was a NATO-led multinational force that performed peacekeeping in Afghanistan, 2001–2014. (see also UNAMA)
 RS was a NATO-led multinational force that performs train, advise and assist missions in Afghanistan from December 2014-July 2021. (see also UNAMA)

ECOMOG
Nigeria led missions of the Economic Community of West African States Monitoring Group (ECOMOG) to:
 End the First and Second Liberian Civil Wars, 1990–1995 and 2003 respectively.
 End the Sierra Leone Civil War, 1997-2000. The Organisation of African Unity endorsed the Nigerian-led West African peacekeeping force in 1998.
 Guinea-Bissau in 1999
 Guinea/Liberia border in 2001.

African Union

 AMIS was the African Union force in Darfur, Sudan starting August 2004 in response to the Darfur Conflict. It merged with UNAMID, a UN-mandated peacekeeping force deployed in Darfur, in December 2007.

Others
 Indian Peace Keeping Force (IPKF) - Indian peacekeeping operations in Sri Lanka between 1987 and 1990.
 International Force East Timor (INTERFET), multinational peacekeeping force in East Timor between 1999 and 2000.
 The Australian/New Zealand-led Operation Helpem Fren in the Solomon Islands (July 2003-June 2017) and Operation Astute in Timor-Leste (May 2006-May 2013).
 Temporary International Presence in Hebron, a civilian observer mission in Hebron, West Bank between 1994 and 2019.
 UNOCI, a joint mission with United Nations in Ivory Coast between 2004 and 2017
 UNMIL, a joint mission with United Nations in Liberia between 2003 and 2018

See also

 List of United Nations peacekeeping missions

References